Aer Arann Islands (stylised as aer arann islands) is an Irish airline headquartered in Inverin, County Galway. They operate a three-strong fleet of Britten-Norman BN-2 Islander aircraft to connect the Aran Islands with mainland County Galway.

History
Aer Arann Islands was established in 1970 by James Coen, Ralph Langan, Jimmy Codd and Colie Hernon to provide an island-hopping air service between Galway and the Aran Islands off the west coast of Ireland. Operations, using a single Britten-Norman Islander, began in August 1970. This service is now based at Connemara Airport and operates between ten and thirty flights to the three Aran islands with an average flight time of eight minutes.  Aer Arann Islands prefers the Britten-Norman islander aircraft to provide this service.

 the airline is under new ownership with plans to develop and maintain the levels of service to both island communities and visitors.

Current fleet 
As of March 2022, Aer Arann Islands operate a fleet of 3 Britten Norman BN-2 aircraft.

Destinations
Aer Arann Islands destinations
 Aran Islands
 Inis Meáin – Inishmaan Aerodrome
 Inis Mór – Inishmore Aerodrome
 Inis Oírr – Inisheer Aerodrome
 Ireland (mainland)
 Inverin – Connemara Airport Base

See also
 Aer Arann
 List of airlines
 Transport in Ireland
 Connemara Airport
 Inishmore Aerodrome
 Inisheer Aerodrome
 Inishmaan Aerodrome

References

External links

 Aer Arann Islands official website

Airlines of the Republic of Ireland
European Regions Airline Association
Aran Islands
Airlines established in 1970